is a railway station on the Shinano Railway Line in the city of Chikuma, Nagano, Japan, operated by the third-sector railway operating company Shinano Railway.

Lines
Chikuma Station is served by the Shinano Railway Line and is 57.1 kilometers from the starting point of the line at Karuizawa Station.

Station layout
The station consists of two opposed  ground-level side platforms serving two tracks, connected to the station building by a footbridge.

Platforms

Adjacent stations

History 
Chikuma Station opened on 14 March 2009.

Passenger statistics
In fiscal 2011, the station was used by an average of 825 passengers daily.

Surrounding area
Goka Post Office
Goka Elementary School

See also
List of railway stations in Japan

References

External links

 

Railway stations in Japan opened in 2009
Shinano Railway Line
Railway stations in Nagano Prefecture
Chikuma, Nagano